Gorbatkov is a Russian masculine surname, its feminine counterpart is Gorbatkova. It may refer to
Dmitry Gorbatkov (born 1981), Kazakhstani volleyball player
Nelli Gorbatkova (1958–1981), Russian field hockey player 

Russian-language surnames